Elliott Woolfolk Major (October 20, 1864 – July 9, 1949) was an American lawyer and Democratic politician from Pike County, Missouri who served as the 25th Attorney General of Missouri and the 33rd Governor of Missouri.

Biography
Born in 1864 in Lincoln County, Missouri, Elliott Major attended Lincoln County public schools. He then went to Watson Seminary in Pike County. After studying law, he was admitted to the bar in 1885. Major's political rise began with a seat in the Missouri Senate, which he held between 1897 and 1901. Between 1909 and 1913 he was Attorney General of Missouri. In November 1912 he was elected the new governor of his state.

Major took up his new post on January 13, 1913. Several new agencies emerged in Missouri during his four-year tenure. These included the Highway Commission, a pardon committee, assistance to the blind, and a public services committee. In addition, the state flag of Missouri was officially presented and introduced at that time.

After his tenure ended in January 1917, Major retired from politics and returned to practice as a lawyer. His office was in St. Louis. He was married to Elizabeth Myers, with whom he had three children. He died on July 9, 1949 in Eureka, Missouri and was buried in the Bowling Green City Cemetery at Bowling Green, Missouri.

References

External links

1864 births
1949 deaths
Democratic Party governors of Missouri
Missouri Attorneys General
People from St. Louis County, Missouri
People from Lincoln County, Missouri